Songfest may refer to:

 Songfest: A Cycle of American Poems for Six Singers and Orchestra, a 1977 work by Leonard Bernstein
 Steel Bridge Songfest, in Sturgeon Bay, Wisconsin
 Song festival (disambiguation)

See also
 Singfest
 Sonfest
 SongVest